Harmony Township may refer to:

Illinois
 Harmony Township, Hancock County, Illinois

Indiana
 Harmony Township, Posey County, Indiana
 Harmony Township, Union County, Indiana

Kansas
 Harmony Township, Stevens County, Kansas, in Stevens County, Kansas

Minnesota
 Harmony Township, Minnesota

Missouri
 Harmony Township, Washington County, Missouri

New Jersey
 Harmony Township, New Jersey

North Dakota
 Harmony Township, Cass County, North Dakota, in Cass County, North Dakota

Ohio
 Harmony Township, Clark County, Ohio
 Harmony Township, Morrow County, Ohio

Pennsylvania
 Harmony Township, Beaver County, Pennsylvania
 Harmony Township, Forest County, Pennsylvania
 Harmony Township, Susquehanna County, Pennsylvania

South Dakota
 Harmony Township, Edmunds County, South Dakota, in Edmunds County, South Dakota
 Harmony Township, Jerauld County, South Dakota, in Jerauld County, South Dakota
 Harmony Township, Spink County, South Dakota, in Spink County, South Dakota

Township name disambiguation pages